Sir Bryn Terfel Jones,  (born 9 November 1965) (known professionally as  Bryn Terfel) is a Welsh bass-baritone opera and concert singer. Terfel was initially associated with the roles of Mozart, particularly Figaro, Leporello and Don Giovanni, but has subsequently shifted his attention to heavier roles, especially those by Puccini and Wagner.

Biography
Bryn Terfel Jones was born in Pant Glas, Caernarfonshire, Wales, the son of a farmer. His first language is Welsh. To avoid confusion with another Welsh baritone, Delme Bryn-Jones, he chose Bryn Terfel as his professional name. He had an interest in and talent for music from a very young age. A family friend taught him how to sing, starting with traditional Welsh songs.

After winning numerous competitions for his singing, he moved to London in 1984 and entered the Guildhall School of Music and Drama where he studied under Rudolf Piernay. In 1988 he entered and won the Morriston Orpheus Choir Supporters' Association Young Welsh Singer of the Year Competition. He graduated in 1989, winning both the Kathleen Ferrier Memorial Award and the Gold Medal. The same year he came second behind Dmitri Hvorostovsky in the Cardiff Singer of the World competition, but won the Lieder Prize.

Career

1990s
In 1990 Terfel made his operatic debut as Guglielmo in Così fan tutte for Welsh National Opera, and later in the same season he sang the title role in The Marriage of Figaro, a role with which he made his debut with English National Opera in 1991.

His international operatic career began that same year when he sang the Speaker in Mozart's The Magic Flute at the Théâtre de la Monnaie in Brussels and he made his United States debut as Figaro at the Santa Fe Opera.

In 1992 Terfel made his Royal Opera House, Covent Garden debut as Masetto in Don Giovanni, with Thomas Allen in the title role. That same year he made his Salzburg Easter Festival debut singing the role of the Spirit Messenger in Die Frau ohne Schatten. This was followed by an international breakthrough at the main Salzburg Festival when he sang Jochanaan in Strauss's Salome. He went on to make his debut as Figaro at the Vienna State Opera.

On 19 June 1992 Terfel made his U.S. concert debut singing in Mahler's Eighth Symphony with the Chicago Symphony Orchestra at the Ravinia Festival under the baton of James Levine. Also at the festival, on 22 June, he and Levine (at the piano) performed Schumann's Liederkreis (op. 39) and Schubert's Schwanengesang, and on 27 June he was Abimélech in Saint-Saëns's Samson and Delilah (with Plácido Domingo and Denyce Graves in the title roles), also with the CSO under Levine. In January and February 1993, Terfel sang the role of Donner in Wagner's Das Rheingold at Lyric Opera of Chicago; Zubin Mehta conducted.

Also in 1992, he signed an exclusive recording contract with Deutsche Grammophon, and returned to the Welsh National Opera to sing Ford in Falstaff.  In 1993, he recorded the role of Wilfred Shadbolt in The Yeomen of the Guard, by Gilbert and Sullivan and sang Figaro to acclaim at the Théâtre du Châtelet in Paris.

In 2000 Terfel said that he would like to record "an album of Gilbert and Sullivan arias".

In 1994 Terfel sang Figaro at Covent Garden, and made both his Metropolitan Opera and Teatro Nacional de São Carlos debuts in the same role.  However, back surgery in 1994 (and again in 2000) prevented him from performing in several scheduled events.

In 1996 he expanded his repertoire to include more Wagner, singing Wolfram in Tannhäuser at the Metropolitan Opera, and Stravinsky, singing Nick Shadow in The Rake's Progress at the Welsh National Opera. These performances won him the Royal Philharmonic Society Award for the singer of the year.

In 1997 Terfel made his La Scala debut as Figaro. In 1998, he had a recital at Carnegie Hall which included works by Wolf, Fauré, Brahms, Schumann, Schubert, and others. In 1999, he performed in Paris the title role of Don Giovanni for the first time and sang his first Falstaff at the Lyric Opera of Chicago; the latter of which he reprised in the inaugural production at the newly refurbished Royal Opera House.

In 1999 Terfel performed the Rugby World Cup anthem "World in Union" with Shirley Bassey at the Millennium Stadium before the 1999 Rugby World Cup Final.

2000s
In 2003, Terfel hosted and performed on the stage with opera tenor José Carreras and soprano Hayley Westenra in front of the capacity crowd of 10,000 people from Faenol Festival in Wales.

In 2007 Terfel performed at the opening gala concert for the re-dedication of the Salt Lake Tabernacle with the Mormon Tabernacle Choir on 6–7 April. Later, he performed the title role in a concert version of Sweeney Todd that had four performances from 5–7 July at London's Royal Festival Hall. This idea came from Terfel and his fellow bass-baritone and friend, the Irishman Dermot Malone.

Terfel has not shied away from popular music either. He has recorded CDs of songs by Lerner and Loewe and Rodgers and Hammerstein. In 2001 he commissioned and performed 'Atgof o'r Sêr' ('Memory of the Stars') in the National Eisteddfod with the composer Robat Arwyn.

In September 2007 Terfel withdrew, to severe criticism, from Covent Garden's Der Ring des Nibelungen when his six-year-old son required several operations on his finger. But he did successfully return to the Met in November 2007 to sing the role of Figaro.  He told reporters in New York City that he would retire Figaro from his repertoire. But he did sing the role of Wotan in Covent Garden's revival of the Der Ring in September to November 2012.

Terfel intended to take 2008 as a sabbatical from opera performances, but broke this to take the title role in WNO's revival of Falstaff. He had sung in this production in 1993, when he played the role of Ford. In 2009 Terfel sang Scarpia and the Dutchman for the Royal Opera House.

Since 2010
In 2010, Terfel made his debut as Hans Sachs in Wagner's Die Meistersinger in a production for Welsh National Opera, in Cardiff and on tour.

On 17 July 2010, the cast of this production gave a "concert staging" at the Royal Albert Hall as part of the 2010 BBC Proms, which was broadcast on BBC Radio 3 and on BBC Four television. On 31 July, again at the Proms, he performed in a concert from the Royal Albert Hall celebrating the works of Stephen Sondheim, in his 80th birthday year.

Terfel took on the role of Wotan for the premiere performances of Robert Lepage's new Met staging of Wagner's Der Ring 2010–12. He sang the role in all three of the four Der Ring operas that feature Wotan: Das Rheingold, Die Walküre and Siegfried.

In September 2013 Terfel collaborated with Mormon Tabernacle Choir released the album Homeward Bound which reached No. 58 Official UK Charts.

In September 2014 Terfel reprised his role as Sweeney Todd in the Live from Lincoln Center concert production of Sweeney Todd, which was broadcast on PBS.  This production also starred Emma Thompson as Mrs Lovett and Audra McDonald as the Beggar Woman.

In 2016 Terfel took the title role in Mussorgsky's Boris Godunov, directed by Antonio Pappano at the Royal Opera House.

Personal life
Terfel was married to his childhood sweetheart, Lesley, in 1987 until their divorce in 2013.
 The couple have three sons.

In 2017 he and harpist Hannah Stone had a daughter. The couple married on 26 July 2019 at Caersalem Newydd Baptist Church in the bride's home city of Swansea.

Terfel was a leading petitioner in the creation of Bontnewydd railway station on the rebuilt Welsh Highland Railway, and in part sponsored its construction.

Partial solo discography

Bryn Terfel – Volume I (1988)
Bryn Terfel – Volume II (1990)
The Vagabond and Other Songs by Vaughan Williams, Butterworth, Finzi and Ireland (1995)
Something Wonderful (1996)
Handel Arias (1997)
We'll Keep a Welcome (2000)
Some Enchanted Evening (2001)
Under the Stars (2003), with Renée Fleming
Bryn (2003)
Simple Gifts (2005)
Tutto Mozart! (2006)
First Love (2008), songs from the British Isles
Carols and Christmas Songs (2010)
Homeward Bound (2013), with the Mormon Tabernacle Choir
Dreams and Songs (2018)

Welsh albums

Videography
 James Levine's 25th Anniversary Metropolitan Opera Gala (1996), Deutsche Grammophon DVD, B0004602-09

Honours and awards
Terfel continues to be a patron of the Welsh language and Welsh culture, facets of his life which are largely unknown outside his native Wales. Terfel has been awarded the honour, by the National Eisteddfod, of membership of the Gorsedd of Bards. The Gorsedd was created in 1792 as a celebration of Welsh heritage, and inductees are considered to have contributed to Welsh culture.

Morriston Orpheus Choir Supporters' Association (MOCSA) Young Welsh Singer of the Year (1988)
Commander of the Order of the British Empire (2003) 
Queen's Medal for Music (2006)
Honorary Fellow of Jesus College, Oxford (2008)
Honorary Doctorate in Music, Bangor University (2012)
Honorary Doctorate in Music, Royal College of Music (2012)
 Austrian Kammersänger (2022)

Terfel was knighted in the 2017 New Year Honours for services to music.

Terfel is also President of the Welsh homelessness charity Shelter Cymru and is Patron of Bobath Children's Therapy Centre Wales, a registered charity based in Cardiff which provides specialist Bobath therapy to children from all over Wales who have cerebral palsy.

Terfel is a Vice President of the Dunvant Male Choir in Swansea, the oldest continuously singing Welsh choir, dating from 1895. The choir sang at Terfel's wedding in 2019.

Faenol Festival
In 2000 Terfel founded the Faenol Festival (known in Welsh as "Gŵyl y Faenol"), at the Faenol Estate near Snowdonia, Wales. Billed as "Bryn Terfel's Faenol Festival" (often referred to as "BrynFest") turned into an annual music festival featuring internationally famous opera singers as well as popular Welsh artists. In the same year he released We'll Keep a Welcome – The Welsh Album, an anthology of favourite traditional songs. The festival had been voted a £250,000 grant by the Welsh Assembly, but did not take place in 2009 or 2010 and ended as of 2010. Subsequently, the 2012 Faenol Festival took place in London.

Operatic repertoire
Terfel has performed the following roles on stage:

See also
List of Welsh musicians

References

External links

 Bryn Terfel at Official Deutsche Grammophon site
 www.brynfest.com Faenol Festival
 Bryn Terfel biography from BBC Wales

1965 births
Alumni of the Guildhall School of Music and Drama
Bards of the Gorsedd
Commanders of the Order of the British Empire
Grammy Award winners
Honorary Members of the Royal Academy of Music
Living people
People from Caernarfonshire
Operatic bass-baritones
Welsh Eisteddfod winners
20th-century Welsh male opera singers
21st-century Welsh male opera singers
Welsh-language singers
Welsh bass-baritones
Deutsche Grammophon artists
People educated at Ysgol Dyffryn Nantlle
Knights Bachelor
Singers awarded knighthoods
Österreichischer Kammersänger